TV-2 (stylized as ·2) is a Danish pop rock band group formed in 1981 in Aarhus. The group is composed of Steffen Brandt, Hans Erik Lerchenfeld, Georg Olesen, and Sven Gaul. Having released 19 studio albums, four live albums and three compilations, they are one of the most commercially successful Danish bands of all time - according to the band's own sales figures, they have sold more than two million records.

TV-2 was formed prior to the Danish television station TV 2, which began broadcasting in 1988. The band was originally called Taurus with lyrics sung in English. Taurus released a single album, Whatever Happened To The Sixties, in 1978. Taurus changed their name to TV-2 in 1981, and begun singing in Danish at the same time. TV-2's success can be attributed to Steffen Brandt's songwriting, that often features ironic and satirical observations about the Danish middle class; making fun of its consumerism and conformity. Some of their songs, such as Fantastiske Toyota ("Fantastic Toyota"), are known to have commercial like concepts, with satirical undertones. Because of the mundane nature of the songwriting, TV-2 used to refer jokingly to themselves as "Denmark's most boring band".

In the beginning of their career, TV-2 played new wave pop music, heavily influenced by Kraftwerk, Talking Heads and the Danish band Kliché, where Steffen Brandt briefly played keyboards. In the band's early years, the critical reception was negative, as TV-2 were unfavourably compared to Kliché, but around the release of their third album Beat, music critics became more positive. The band has cited Beat as a defining album, where the band found their own unique sound.

Over the years, TV-2's music has gone through several phases, including a more acoustic folk pop sound. In 2005, TV-2 had a major comeback with the hit single De første kærester på månen, where the group returned to their roots and played 1980s-styled new wave music once again. The 1988 album Nærmest Lykkelig were added to the Danish Culture Canon in 2006.

Band members 

 Steffen Brandt – vocals, keyboards, guitar
 Hans Erik Lerchenfeld – guitar
 Georg Olesen – bass guitar
 Sven Gaul – drums

Discography

Studio albums

Live albums

Compilation albums

References

External links
Official website

Danish musical groups
Musical groups established in 1981